Armadillo is a genus of isopods belonging to the family Armadillidae.

The genus has almost cosmopolitan distribution.

Species

Species: 

Armadillo affinis 
Armadillo albipes 
Armadillo albomarginatus 
Armadillo officinalis

References

Isopoda